Pamela Denise McGee (born December 1, 1962) is an American former professional women's basketball player, 2012 Women's Basketball Hall of Famer, and mother of two professional basketball players.  She is the first WNBA mom to have a son and daughter drafted in the NBA and the WNBA. She is the only Olympic Gold Medalist to give birth to an Olympian in basketball.    Her son JaVale received a gold medal in the 2021 Olympics in Tokyo. This was 37 years after his mother won hers in the 1984 Olympics in Los Angeles California.  This would be the first of many first in her illustrious Basketball career.  A pioneer in Women’s Basketball is featured in a HBO documentary,”Women of Troy”.

Pamela McGee was the second overall pick in the 1997 WNBA draft. She played in the league for two seasons with the Sacramento Monarchs and Los Angeles Sparks.

McGee grew up in Flint, Michigan, where she attended Flint Southwestern Academy before graduating from Flint Northern High School. At Northern Highschool she was both an Academic All American and won two back to back state championships in Women's Basketball and Women's Track.  She set the state record in the Shot put in track and field.  She was the MVP of the Parade All American game which hosted the top players in the nation.

McGee won back-to-back NCAA Championships as an All-American at the University of Southern California, where she was a teammate of twin sister Paula, Cynthia Cooper and Cheryl Miller. In 1984, she won Olympic gold in Los Angeles before embarking on a professional career that included stints in Brazil, France, Italy and Spain.  She was inducted into the Women's Basketball Hall of Fame in 2012.

She has been noted as one of the few women basketball players who has won on every level.  Two State Championships in Michigan with a still standing record of 75-0 wins;  She then won two National Championships at the University of Southern California in the eighties.  That same year she graduated as student-athlete in 4 years with a BA in Economics and Social Science with an emphasis on Finance.  That same year she was the first to win a Gold-Medal at the LA Olympics in Women's Basketball.  She then won World Championships in Barcelona Spain, Brazilian World Championships, and the European Ronchetti Cup with 4-time WNBA MVP Cynthia Cooper.

Professional career
McGee started her professional career with the Dallas Diamonds in the Women's American Basketball Association where she played alongside her sister Paula. She later played in Brazil, Spain and Italy and was a four-time Italian League All-Star. McGee was a first round draft pick in the inaugural season of the WNBA and played there for two seasons.

USA Basketball
McGee was selected to be a member of the team representing the US at the 1983 Pan American Games held in Caracas, Venezuela. The team won all five games to earn the gold medal for the event. McGee averaged 3.4 points per game.

McGee played for the USA National team in the 1983 World Championships, held in Sao Paulo, Brazil. The team won six games, but lost two against the Soviet Union. In an opening round game, the USA team had a nine-point lead at halftime, but the Soviets came back to take the lead, and a final shot by the USA failed to drop, leaving the USSR team with a one-point victory 85–84. The USA team won their next four games, setting up the gold medal game against USSR. This game was also close, and was tied at 82 points each with six seconds to go in the game. The Soviets Elena Chausova received the inbounds pass and hit the game winning shot in the final seconds, giving the USSR team the gold medal with a score of 84–82. The USA team earned the silver medal. McGee averaged 4.2 points per game.

In 1984, the USA sent its national team to the 1984 William Jones Cup competition in Taipei, Taiwan, for pre-Olympic practice. The team easily beat each of the eight teams they played, winning by an average of just under 50 points per game. McGee averaged 6.5 points per game.

She continued with the national team to represent the US at the 1984 Olympics. The team won all six games to claim the gold medal. McGee averaged 6.2 points per game.

Statistics

College statistics

Source

WNBA statistics

|-
| style="text-align:left;"|1997
| style="text-align:left;"|Sacramento
| 27 || 23 || 25.6 || .459 || .286 || .705 || 4.4 || 0.7 || 1.0 || 0.5 || 2.7 || 10.6
|-
| style="text-align:left;"|1998
| style="text-align:left;"|Los Angeles
| 30 || 22 || 19.0 || .437 || .000 || .614 || 4.8 || 0.4 || 0.8 || 0.8 || 1.8 || 6.8
|-
| style="text-align:left;"|Career
| style="text-align:left;"|2 years, 2 teams
| 57 || 45 || 22.1 || .449 || .182 || .670 || 4.6 || 0.6 || 0.9 || 0.7 || 2.2 || 8.6

Personal life
McGee has a daughter, WNBA player Imani McGee-Stafford and a son, NBA player and NBA champion JaVale McGee, currently with the Dallas Mavericks. McGee is the first WNBA player to have a child play in the NBA and WNBA. In 2012, she was inducted into the Women's Basketball Hall of Fame. She lives in Annandale, Virginia.

The consecutive NCAA championships followed two Michigan state championships at Flint Northern High School. Besides playing in France, Italy and Brazil, she was drafted #2 at 34 years old, into the WNBA. She starred for the Los Angeles Sparks and Sacramento Monarchs.

JaVale McGee is the first son of a WNBA player to ever play in the NBA. McGee's husband George Montgomery was drafted to the NBA with the 35th pick in the 1985 NBA draft although he never played there. McGee, with a degree in economics, balanced her international basketball career with raising both children, home schooling, coaching and teaching school in the off season, though the formidable tasks were not without controversy.

In 2013, it was announced that McGee and her son JaVale would be starring in their own reality television show, Mom's Got Game.

In 2021, her son JaVale won an Olympic gold medal for USA Basketball, making them the first mother-and-son duo to win Olympic gold.

References

External links
 
 https://web.archive.org/web/20110224011311/http://www.wnba.com/coachfile/pamela_mcgee/index.html?nav=page
 WNBA Statistics at basketball-reference.com

1962 births
Living people
African-American basketball players
American women's basketball coaches
American women's basketball players
Basketball coaches from Michigan
Basketball players at the 1983 Pan American Games
Basketball players at the 1984 Summer Olympics
Basketball players from Flint, Michigan
Centers (basketball)
Identical twins
Los Angeles Sparks players
Medalists at the 1984 Summer Olympics
Olympic gold medalists for the United States in basketball
Pan American Games gold medalists for the United States
Pan American Games medalists in basketball
Parade High School All-Americans (girls' basketball)
People from Humboldt County, California
People from Annandale, Virginia
Power forwards (basketball)
Sacramento Monarchs players
American twins
Twin sportspeople
USC Trojans women's basketball players
Medalists at the 1983 Pan American Games
21st-century African-American people
21st-century African-American women
20th-century African-American sportspeople
20th-century African-American women
United States women's national basketball team players